Demetrious is a given name. Notable people with the given name include:

Demetrious Cox (born 1994), American football player
Demetrious Johnson (born 1986), American mixed martial artist 
Demetrious Johnson (American football) (1961-2022), American football player
Demetrious Maxie (born 1973), Canadian football player

See also
Demetrious, character from Dragon Ball Z: Bardock – The Father of Goku